Southern Crossings is an Australian jazz/world music band previously known as Atherton Tableband. They were formed in the mid eighties by Michael Atherton, Michael Askill and John Napier and were later expanded with Jess Ciampa.

Members
John Napier
Michael Askill
Michael Atherton
Jess Ciampa

Discography
Southern Crossings (1987) - Sandstock Music
Track (1991) - Spiral Scratch

References

Australian musical groups